The Taichung Broadcasting Bureau is a former radio station in North District, Taichung, Taiwan.

History
The station building was opened on 11 May 1935 as the third radio station in Taiwan during the Japanese rule to broadcast radio and news to central Taiwan. In 2015, the ＠STUDIO obtained the rights to manage and operate the building.

Exhibitions
The station regularly exhibits design, photography, music and culture.

Transportation
The station is accessible within walking distance north of Taichung Station of Taiwan Railways.

See also
 List of tourist attractions in Taiwan

References

1935 establishments in Taiwan
Buildings and structures in Taichung
Radio stations established in the 20th century
Tourist attractions in Taichung
Defunct mass media in Taiwan